Großer Varchentiner See is a lake in the Mecklenburgische Seenplatte district in Mecklenburg-Vorpommern, Germany. At an elevation of 34.1 m, its surface area is 1.81 km².

Lakes of Mecklenburg-Western Pomerania
LGrosserVarchentinerSee